Champlain Marcil (19202010) was a French Canadian photojournalist best known for being the photographer of the daily newspaper Le Droit from 1948 to 1969.  In addition, he was active from 1940 to 1985 in depicting the Outaouais region of western Quebec and Ontario.

Personal life
Marcil was born in Ottawa in June, 1920.  He married in 1947, and had five children.  He died in 2010 and is interred in Notre-Dame Cemetery in Ottawa.  He was a life member of the University of Ottawa, and a member of various Christian organizations.

Career
He began his career as a professional photographer in 1940, recording the Eucharistic Congress at Trois-Rivières.
At the same time, he was class photographer for 125 schools in the Hawkesbury - Ottawa area.

The Champlain Marcil archives contains 135,425 photographs and is preserved in the Bibliothèque et Archives nationales du Québec (National Library and Archives of Québec) in Gatineau.

References

External links 
 Champlain Marcil archives at Bibliothèque et Archives nationales du Québec.

Canadian photojournalists
1920 births
2010 deaths
Burials at Notre-Dame Cemetery (Ottawa)